Václav Láska (born 4 August 1974 in Rakovník.) is a Czech politician and head of the Senator 21 party, which he founded in 2017. He was elected to the Czech Senate during the 2020 election. Láska ran as independent with the support of Czech Pirate Party.

References

External links 

 YouTube channel
 
 

1974 births
Living people
Members of the Senate of the Czech Republic
People from Rakovník
University of South Bohemia alumni
Senator 21 Senators